Medardas Čobotas pol. Medard Czobot (born 26 May 1928 in Medininkai - died 30 August 2009 in Vilnius) was a Polish-Lithuanian politician.  In 1990 he was among those who signed the Act of the Re-Establishment of the State of Lithuania.

References

1928 births
2009 deaths
People from Vilnius District Municipality
People from Wilno Voivodeship (1926–1939)
Lithuanian people of Polish descent
Soviet people of Polish descent
Members of the Seimas
Signatories of the Act of the Re-Establishment of the State of Lithuania